The 2019–20 Wichita State Shockers men's basketball team represented Wichita State University in the 2019–20 NCAA Division I men's basketball season. They played their home games at Charles Koch Arena in Wichita, Kansas and were led by head coach Gregg Marshall, who coached in his 13th and final season at the school. They are members of the American Athletic Conference.

Previous season
The Shockers finished the 2018–19 season 22–15, 10–8 in AAC play and finished in sixth place. In the first round of the AAC tournament the Shockers would go on to win against the 11 seeded East Carolina, would beat Temple in the quarterfinals, but would lose in the semifinals to the eventual champions of the AAC, Cincinnati.

Wichita State would receive a six seed in the NIT and would beat Furman in the first round, beat Clemson in the second round, and beat Indiana, but would lose to Lipscomb in the semifinals.

Offseason

Departures

2019 recruiting class

Incoming transfers

Roster

Schedule and results

|-
!colspan=12 style=| Exhibition

|-
!colspan=12 style=| Regular season

|-
!colspan=12 style=| American Conference tournament
|-

|-

Source
1.Cancelled due to the COVID-19 pandemic

Rankings

*AP does not release post-NCAA Tournament rankings

Awards and honors

American Athletic Conference honors

All-AAC Second Team
Jaime Echenique

Player of the Week
Week 6: Erik Stevenson
Week 9: Erik Stevenson

Rookie of the Week
Week 5: Tyson Etienne
Week 8: Grant Sherfield

Source

References

Wichita State Shockers men's basketball seasons
Wichita State
Shock